Imerkhevi is a village at an altitude of 350 meters from sea level in the Gagra District of Abkhazia, Georgia.

Notes

Literature 
 Georgian Soviet Encyclopedia, V. 5, p. 116, Tb., 1980.

References

Populated places in Gagra District